Andriy Horban (born 21 March 1978) is a Ukrainian professional football coach and a former player.

Career
Horban after retiring as footballer stayed in Kirovohrad Oblast and became a manager within FC Zirka Kropyvnytskyi.

Before becoming a head coach of Zirka, he was coaching its under-19 team in Ukrainian Premier League.

References

External links
Andriy Horban at the FFU Footpass

Andriy Horban at the Luhansk Our Football

1978 births
Living people
People from Pervomaiskyi
Ukrainian footballers
Ukrainian expatriate footballers
Expatriate footballers in Azerbaijan
Ukrainian football managers
FC Zirka Kropyvnytskyi players
FC Zirka-2 Kirovohrad players
Turan-Tovuz IK players
FC Elektrometalurh-NZF Nikopol players
FC Enerhiya Yuzhnoukrainsk players
FC Zorya Luhansk players
FC Zorya-2 Luhansk players
FC Oleksandriya players
FC Sevastopol players
FC Nyva Ternopil players
FC Olimpik Kropyvnytskyi players
FC Yednist Plysky players
FC Lokomotyv Znamianka players
FC Zirka Kropyvnytskyi managers
Association football midfielders
Sportspeople from Kharkiv Oblast